Manx National Glens is a collective term for a series of glens in the Isle of Man which have been officially designated as tourist attractions. They are maintained by  the Department of Environment, Food and Agriculture. The island is known for its "pocket sized" natural glens.

Many of these glens (in Manx, glion or glan) are to be found in wooded, steep river cuttings.

List of National Glens

Friends
The Friends of the Glens is an informal volunteer organisation dedicated to promoting the Manx glens.

See also
Sulby Glen

References

External links
National Glens of the Isle of Man
Information about the Glens and Plantations of the Isle of Man

Geography of the Isle of Man